The  is an annual event on the LPGA of Japan Tour. It is usually played in September and in recent years at the  Shin Minami Aichi Country Club Mihama Course, Mihama, Aichi. It was founded in 1970. The purse in 2022 was ¥100,000,000 with ¥18,000,000 going to the winner.

Winners
Sumitomo Life Vitality Ladies Tokai Classic
2022 Amiyu Ozeki – 
2021 Yuna Nishimura – 

Descente Ladies Tokai Classic
2020 Ayaka Furue – 
2019 Hinako Shibuno – 

Munsingwear Ladies Tokai Classic
2018 Kotono Kozuma – 
2017 Fumika Kawagishi – 
2016 Teresa Lu – 
2015 Kim Ha-neul – 
2014 Jiyai Shin – 
2013 Sakura Yokomine – 
2012 Natsu Nagai – 
2011 Mayu Hattori – 
2010 Jeon Mi-jeong – 
2009 Sakura Yokomine – 
2008 Yuri Fudoh – 
2007 Zhang Na – 
2006 Akiko Fukushima – 
2005 Shiho Oyama – 
2004 Hiromi Motegi – 
2003 Yuri Fudoh – 
2002 Kasumi Fujii – 
2001 Fuki Kido – 

Yukijirushi Ladies Tokai Classic
2000 Yuri Fudoh – 
1999 Lee Young-me – 
1998 Kaori Higo – 
1997 Akiko Fukushima – 
1996 Maki Maeda – 
1995 Fumiko Muraguchi – 
1994 Michiko Hattori – 
1993 Michiko Hattori – 
1992 Chieko Nishida – 
1991 Patti Rizzo – 
1990 Shihomi Suzuki and Kikuko Shibata –  (tied)

Tokai Classic
1989 Ayako Okamoto – 
1988 Megumi Ishikawa – 
1987 Ku Ok-hee- 
1986 Huang Bie-shyun  – 
1985 Ritsu Imahori – 
1984 Satoko Sawada – 
1983 Wu Ming-yeh – 
1982 Ayako Okamoto – 
1981 Tatsuko Ohsako – 
1980 Hisako Higuchi – 
1979 Ayako Okamoto – 
1978 Tu Ai-yu – 
1977 Hisako Higuchi – 
1976 Hisako Higuchi – 
1975 Hisako Higuchi – 
1974 Tu Ai-yu – 
1973 Hisako Higuchi – 
1972 Hisako Higuchi – 
1971 Hisako Higuchi – 
1970 Sandra Palmer –

References

External links
Coverage on the LPGA of Japan Tour's official site
 

Golf tournaments in Japan
LPGA of Japan Tour events
Recurring sporting events established in 1970
1970 establishments in Japan